Darren Shaun Bradshaw (born 19 March 1967) is an English former professional footballer. He played as a centre-back primarily but could also move into midfield. His playing career spanned fifteen years, during which he made over 200 Football League appearances.

Career
While with Sheffield Wednesday, one of his hometown clubs, Bradshaw was capped by the England national youth team in 1984. He began his senior career in non-League football with Matlock Town in 1986. He was loaned the following year to Chesterfield, marking his entry into the professional game.

He signed for York City on a free transfer in 1987, and went on to make 59 league appearances for the Minstermen in two years, scoring three goals.

In 1989, Jim Smith signed Bradshaw to Newcastle United. In three years at St James' Park, he made 38 appearances.

Peterborough United was his next stop, in 1992. He made 73 appearances for the Posh, finding the net on a single occasion. In his second and final year at London Road, he was loaned out to Plymouth Argyle.

In 1994, Bradshaw joined Sam Allardyce's Blackpool for a fee of £35,000. In three years at Bloomfield Road, he made 68 appearances, again finding the net just once.

Approaching the age of 30, Bradshaw decided to move back into the non-league game. He joined Rushden & Diamonds in 1997. He also went on to play for Stevenage Borough, Worksop Town and Belper Town before retiring in 2005 at the age of 38.

References

Sources
Bradshaw's stats at Soccerbase

1967 births
Living people
Footballers from Sheffield
English footballers
England youth international footballers
Association football defenders
Association football midfielders
Matlock Town F.C. players
Chesterfield F.C. players
York City F.C. players
Newcastle United F.C. players
Peterborough United F.C. players
Plymouth Argyle F.C. players
Blackpool F.C. players
Rushden & Diamonds F.C. players
Stevenage F.C. players
Worksop Town F.C. players
Belper Town F.C. players
English Football League players
National League (English football) players